The Maranon tyrannulet (Nesotriccus maranonicus) is a species of bird in the tyrant flycatcher family Tyrannidae. It occurs in a wide range of scrubby and wooded habitats in northeastern Peru. :

References

Nesotriccus
Birds of Peru
Birds described in 1941